Gaëtan Frys (born 21 May 1955) is a Belgian sprint canoer who competed from the mid-1970s to the early 1980s. At the 1976 Summer Olympics in Montreal, he was eliminated in the semifinals of the K-1 500 m event. Four years later in Moscow, Frys was eliminated in the repechages of the K-2 500 m event.

References

1955 births
Belgian male canoeists
Canoeists at the 1976 Summer Olympics
Canoeists at the 1980 Summer Olympics
Living people
Olympic canoeists of Belgium
20th-century Belgian people